Phrurotimpus alarius is a species of true spider in the family Phrurolithidae. It is found in the United States and Canada.

Subspecies
These two subspecies belong to the species Phrurotimpus alarius:
 (Phrurotimpus alarius alarius) (Hentz, 1847)
 Phrurotimpus alarius tejanus (Chamberlin & Gertsch, 1930)

References

External links

 

Phrurolithidae
Articles created by Qbugbot
Spiders described in 1847